List of Professional Leagues from Ghana under the Premier League.

Division One League
The league is divided into three zones with a zone in the southern, middle and northern sectors of the country.

2020-21

Division Two League 

2011–12 teams

Middle League 

 Brong Ahafo Football Association

Zone A
 Berekum Berlin FC
 Mim Freedom Fighters
 Techiman Kenten AC Milan

Zone B
 Japeikrom Asuo PRU
 Nsoatreman FC (Nsoatre)
 Techiman GSP United

 Central Regional Football Association

 Abreshia United
 Adansi Praso WAECO FC
 Agona Swedru Amanpong FC
 Cape Coast Nadel Ahli Rovers
 Ekotsi Hi-Kings FC (also listed as Gomoa Assin Hi-Kings)
 F.C. Takoradi

 Eastern Regional Football Association

 Akosombo Sparks FC
 Amasaman Bright Future FC
 Dawu Sporting Club
 Kwahu Abetifi Odwen Anomah FC
 Real Sportive (Tema)

 Greater Accra Regional Football Association

 Easy Classics
 Great Stars
 Power F.C. (Koforidua)
 Royal Knights (Nsawam)
 Shelter Force

Division Three League 

2011–12 teams
  Jancole Football Academy (Darkuman-Accra)
  Akotex FC (Tema)
 Cornerstones
 Dumas Boys of GTP (Tema)
 Dunkwa-On-Offin Starke FC
 Ghapoha FC
 Monsasonic FC 
 Great Ashantis
 Mankessim Striking Force
 Neoplan Stars
 Palma F.C. 
 S.C. Adelaide
 Techiman Universal Stars
 Thirds World
 Voradep
 Accra angels soccer academy
 Sharp Arrows ((Kanda 441))
 Great African United
 Royal Eagle Football club (Dansoman)

GAFCOA 
Ghana Amateur Football Club Owners Association is an association of amateur (2nd, 3rd and juvenile) club owners who have come together to seek the welfare and development of the named category and to produce quality players for the game of football in Ghana.

References

External links 
 Ghana Leagues

2
Ghana
Ghana